The Egyptian German Automotive Company, or short EGA, is an Egyptian car assembler who is located in the 6th of October City. It was founded by engineer Samy Saad and the former Daimler-Benz CEO Jürgen Erich Schrempp as a joint venture to assemble vehicles of the Mercedes-Benz brand. The management of the 1996 founded firm is assumed by the Daimler AG who has given it to Markus Schäfer.
As of 2015, following the political and economic turmoil in Egypt, assembly of Mercedes-Benz passenger cars has ceased. Since then, the company has been offering sub-assembly for other Automotive assembly plants in Egypt.

Brake Disc Machining
The brake discs machining plant started operation in 2002, basically covering the local content requirements for locally assembled vehicles, as well as minor spare parts supply to Daimler AG in Germany. In 2010, the plant expanded its capacity to 900,000 units annually, supplying Daimler AG with spare parts for a wide range of brake discs, covering recent passenger car models, historical classics and modern commercial vehicles. Export of brake discs has been ongoing since then to Daimler AG warehouses in Germersheim, Germany, as well as commercial vehicles unit in Kassel, Germany.
A product Development and validation facility (dynamometer) has been amended to the plant.

In 2014, the company was validated as VW Group supplier.

Partner companies
EGA is partially owned by National Automotive Company (NATCO), a major player in the Egyptian automotive market.
EGA is a 25% shareholder in a newly-found Grey Cast Iron foundry; Egyptian Kuwaiti Foundry (EKF), which is located nearby, and was established mainly to manufacture raw brake discs and drums for local and global markets.

References

External links
Official website of the Egyptian German Automotive Company
Official website of Mercedes-Benz Egypt

Car manufacturers of Egypt
Mercedes-Benz Group joint ventures
6th of October (city)
Vehicle manufacturing companies established in 1996
Egyptian companies established in 1996